Latisha Chan and Martina Hingis were the defending champions, but Hingis retired from professional tennis at the end of 2017 and Chan could not participate due to a medical condition.

Andrea Sestini Hlaváčková and Barbora Strýcová won the title, defeating Gabriela Dabrowski and Xu Yifan in the final, 4–6, 6–4, [10–8].

Seeds
The top four seeds received a bye into the second round.

Draw

Finals

Top half

Bottom half

References
 Main Draw

Women's Doubles